"Touch" / "Yume no Tsuzuki" (タッチ / 夢の続き) is the fourth single of Younha released on September 7, 2005. It is a cover of the opening theme of Touch originally by Yoshimi Iwasaki.

Track listing
Touch (タッチ)
Yume no Tsuzuki (夢の続き)
Touch (instrumental) (タッチ(instrumental))
Yume no Tsuzuki (instrumental) (夢の続き(instrumental))

2005 singles
Younha songs
2005 songs
Song articles with missing songwriters